Magnum Band is a kompa band formed on June 24, 1976 by  (a.k.a. Dadou), former musician of the group Tabou Combo, and his brother  (a.k.a. Tico) in Miami.

In the late 70s the group became known in various clubs of Queens and Brooklyn thanks to the substantial Haitian community there. In 1980 they made their first international tour.
In 1996, they performed at the 1996 Summer Olympics opening ceremony in Atlanta.
In 1997, the band represented Haiti in the first World Creole Music Festival in Dominica. Throughout their tours in Guadeloupe in 2003 in France, Canada and the United States, the Magnum Band participated in the promotion of Haitian compas, and strengthened its footprint. The group celebrated its thirtieth anniversary in June 2006. The Haitian compas style interpreted by Magnum Band can be categorised as "old school".

In June 2014 the band received the Honneur et Merite price from the Radio Television Caraibe.

André and Claude Pasquet are the uncles of American francophone singer Teri Moïse.

Members

Past members
Jean Almatas
Roland Cameau
Nasser Chery
Essud Fungcap
Jean Robert Narcisse
Yvon Mondésir
Varnel Pierre
Waag Lalanne
Ernst Gabriel
Alexander "Russ" Harden
Ray Tindell
Tom Mitchell
Bob Curtis
Gaeton Villeaux

Discography 

1979. album : Expérience
1980, album : Jehovah 
1981, album : Piké devan
1983, album : La Seule Difference
1985, album : Ashadei
1990, album : Adoration
1993, albums : Tèt ensem, Difé
1994, albums : The best in town, Pure gold, Paka pala
1995, album : Best of Magnum Band
1996, album : San fwontiè
1997, albums : Anthologie volumes 1,2 and 3
1999, album : Live
2000, album : The Anthologies
2001, album : 25ème anniversaire
2004, album : Oulala!

References

External links

Fans of Magnum website archive
Maestro Tico Pasquet on Magnum Band 40 Years Later & Called out Rodney Noel

Haitian musical groups
Haitian-American culture in Miami